Bandar-e Sofla may refer to:
 Bandar-e Sofla, Kermanshah
 Bandar-e Sofla, Mazandaran